Gloria Msindira (born 28 March 1994) is an African model. She was crowned Malawi News Model Of The Year in 2013.

References

1994 births
Living people